Man vs. Child: Chef Showdown is an American cooking reality show shown on FYI.

The show features top-level executive chefs pitted against young cooking prodigies. The show premiered on July 23, 2015 for its first season of 13 episodes. The second season premiered on March 17, 2016.

Format
This reality show has a group of young kid chefs and an executive level chef who are pitted against each other in three rounds of themed competition.

The competitors' overall aptitude and areas of expertise are tested in three dynamic cooking rounds as they are challenged to create a different dish, under unusual circumstances. In the first two rounds, a panel of judges tastes the dishes and determine which chef had created the most delicious and inspired plate. The third and final round is a blind taste test which is judged by a critically acclaimed master-level chef. The overall winner takes home the ultimate prize of bragging.

Season 1 
Each week a team of five child cooking prodigies -Cloyce (13), Holden (14), Emmalee (12), Dylan (11), and Estie (7)  challenge a prolific executive-level chef in the kitchen, where they defend their culinary abilities.

Season 2 
The second season consists of 18 episodes. The child prodigies were joined by newcomers Isiah (10), Olivia (11) and Zion (10). Dylan did not return this season. Adam Gertler, returns as host and Mike Isabella and Alia Zaine return as reoccurring judges and commentators.

Season 2 featured:
Emmalee Rainbow – Chef, Team Prodigy
Holden Dahlerbruch – Chef, Team Prodigy
Olivia Esparra – Chef, Team Prodigy
Isiah Greene – Chef, Team Prodigy
Estie Kung – Chef, Team Prodigy
Cloyce Martin – Chef, Team Prodigy
Zion Otano – Chef, Team Prodigy
Adam Gertler – Host
Mike Isabella – Judge
Alia Zaine – Judge

References

External links 
 

2015 American television series debuts
2010s American reality television series
English-language television shows
FYI (American TV channel) original programming
2016 American television series endings